Zophodia straminea is a species of snout moth in the genus Zophodia. It was described by Strand in 1915. It is found in South Sudan.

References

Endemic fauna of Sudan
Moths described in 1915
Phycitini